AS-8112 is a synthetic compound that acts as a selective antagonist at the dopamine receptor subtypes D2 and D3, and the serotonin receptor 5-HT3. It has potent antiemetic effects in animal studies and has been investigated for potential medical use.

References

Antiemetics
5-HT3 antagonists
Dopamine antagonists
Bromoarenes
Salicylamide ethers
Diazepanes